Typhoon Kong-rey, known in the Philippines as Typhoon Queenie, was a large and powerful typhoon that was tied with Typhoon Yutu as the most powerful tropical cyclone worldwide in 2018. The twenty-fifth tropical storm, eleventh typhoon and 6th super typhoon of the 2018 Pacific typhoon season, Kong-rey originated from a tropical disturbance in the open Pacific. For a couple days, it went westward, organizing into a tropical depression on September 27. Then it intensified into a powerful Category 5 super typhoon early on October 2. Kong-rey underwent an eyewall replacement cycle after its peak intensity, causing it to weaken into a Category 3 typhoon under unfavorable conditions. Kong-rey then struck South Korea on October 6 as a tropical storm. Kong-rey transitioned into an extratropical cyclone later that day while impacting Japan.

A total of 3 people were killed by the storm, including 2 people from South Korea. In South Korea, damage nationwide totaled at ₩54.9 billion (US$48.5 million). Although Kong-rey did not make a direct landfall on Kyushu or Shikoku, its outer rainbands affected the two islands. At an area in Shikoku, rain accumulated to 300 mm. In Nagasaki, more than 12,000 families lost power; in Fukuoka Prefecture, a person died because of the rain, mostly due to drowning. Agricultural damage in Okinawa and Miyazaki Prefecture were about JP¥13.99 billion (US$123 million).

Meteorological history 

In late September 2018, a tropical disturbance formed in the waters near Pohnpei Island in the Federated States of Micronesia. The Joint Typhoon Warning Center also gave the storm, Invest 94W, a low chance of development. Over the next couple of days, the system moved westward and organized into a tropical depression on September 27, and the JMA initiated advisories on the storm, while the JTWC issued a TCFA. On September 28, the JTWC designated the system as 30W, while the JMA issued a gale warning for the system. As Tropical Depression 30W continued strengthening, the system became a tropical storm and was named Kong-rey by the JMA. On September 29, the system moved further west, found itself in favorable conditions for strengthening, and became a tropical storm. Later that day, Kong-rey strengthened into a severe tropical storm, and on September 30, the storm attained typhoon status at 03:00 UTC. Kong-rey continued strengthening, and at 18:00 UTC on October 1, Kong-rey became a Category 4-equivalent super typhoon. Early on October 2, Kong-rey strengthened into a Category 5 super typhoon. 

Unrelated to Kong-rey, Hurricane Walaka was a Category 5 hurricane and Kong-rey had Category 5 super typhoon intensity at the same time, marking the first time since 2005 when two tropical cyclones of Category 5 strength existed simultaneously in the Northern Hemisphere. Affected by vertical wind shear, low ocean heat content and decreasing sea surface temperatures, the storm gradually weakened to a Category 3 typhoon on October 3 while undergoing an eyewall replacement cycle. Increased vertical wind shear and lower sea surface temperatures hampered Kong-rey's strength, and Kong-rey was downgraded to a tropical storm on October 4. Early on October 6, Kong-rey made landfall in Tongyeong, South Gyeongsang Province in South Korea as a high-end tropical storm, and later on the same day, Kong-rey transitioned into an extratropical cyclone, while impacting southern Hokkaido, such as areas near Hakodate.

Preparations and impact

Taiwan 
Kong-rey was closest to Taiwan on the evening of October 4. Many parts of northern Taiwan are affected by their rain belts and strong gusts. The Meteorological Bureau issued special reports on heavy rains in five counties and cities, and also issued special reports on strong winds in 18 counties and cities. Many coastal areas and adjacent sea areas were strongly strengthened by grades 9-11. The gusts hit.

Japan 
As the storm moved towards Japan, the Storm Alert was raised by the Japan Meteorological Agency, which was the highest wind alert raised locally. Kong-rey was an extratropical cyclone when it struck the Okinawa and Miyazaki Prefectures, resulting in agricultural damage of approximately JP¥13.99 billion (US$123 million).

As Kong-rey approached the Ryukyu islands, more than 200 flights to Japan were cancelled, including 6 flights from Hong Kong to Okinawa. Kong-rey was the second typhoon to hit Okinawa in the same week, bringing strong winds and heavy rain to the local area which resulted in eight injuries and a total of 20,000 households facing power outages.

Although Kong-rey did not directly impact the Kyushu and Shikoku regions, the rainband around it brought heavy rain to both regions. The Shikoku region recorded more than 300 millimeters of rainfall in one day, while approximately 12,000 households in Nagasaki faced power outages. Kong-rey also resulted in the death of an individual in Fukuoka.

China 

As Kong-rey entered the Chinese mainland, the National Meteorological Center of China issued a typhoon blue warning signal at 18:00 on October 3. The Fujian Provincial Meteorological Observatory issued a typhoon blue warning signal at 11:45 on October 3.

On the evening of October 5, the coastal area of Zhejiang was affected by Kong-rey, and many tourists visited the shore in Shitang Town, Wenling City. As Kong-rey gradually approached Shanghai, the Shanghai Central Meteorological Observatory issued a typhoon blue warning signal at 17:00 on October 4, and the city flood control headquarters launched the city's flood prevention and prevention level IV emergency response.

South Korea 
Kong-rey made landfall in Tongyeong, Gyeongsangnam-do at 9:50 am local time. The storm caused 2 deaths and 1 disappearance  in the local area, and a total of 277 flights were canceled to and from the local area. There were severe flooding in Yingde and Pohang in Gyeongsangbuk-do, and more than 30 houses in Busan and Jeju Island were flooded. There were 55,000 power outages in Busan. The national economic loss was 54.9 billion won (a contract of 48.5 million US dollars).

See also 

 Other tropical cyclones named Kong-rey
 Weather of 2018
 Tropical cyclones in 2018
 Other tropical cyclones named Queenie
 Typhoon Tip (1979) – A very large tropical cyclone that struck areas affected by Kong-rey
 Typhoon Maemi (2003) – Similar typhoon that struck South Korea
 Typhoon Sanba (2012) – Similar typhoon that struck South Korea and Japan
 Typhoon Trami (2018) – A typhoon that struck Japan before Kong-rey.

References

External links 

 JMA Best Track Data  of Typhoon Kong-rey (1803) (in Japanese)
 JMA General Information of Typhoon Kong-rey (1825) from Digital Typhoon
 30W.KONG-REY from the U.S. Naval Research Laboratory

2018 Pacific typhoon season
Kong-rey